Ivan Zajec (15 July 1869 – 30 July 1952) was a Slovenian sculptor. His work was part of the sculpture event in the art competition at the 1924 Summer Olympics. He also designed a monument designated to France Preseren together with Maks Fabiani

References

1869 births
1952 deaths
19th-century Slovenian sculptors
20th-century Slovenian sculptors
20th-century Slovenian male artists
Slovenian sculptors
Olympic competitors in art competitions
Artists from Ljubljana